Firuzabad (also Romanized as Fīrūzābād) is a village in Vahdat Rural District, in the Central District of Zarand County, Kerman Province, Iran. At the 2006 census, its population was 406, in 91 families.

References 

Populated places in Zarand County